David Komakhidze known as David Koma (stylized as DΛVID KOMΛ) is a Georgian fashion designer based in London, England. 

Celebrities, including Beyonce, Jennifer Lopez, Cara Delevingne, Kendall Jenner and Rosie Huntington-Whiteley and Adele have worn his clothes.

Personal life
Koma was born in Tbilisi, Georgia but moved to Saint Petersburg, Russia, at the age of nine. Koma has a younger brother and sister.

Education
Koma discovered his penchant for drawing and dress design at the age of eight. To pursue his interests, Koma studied Fine Art in Saint Petersburg, taking part in design competitions from age 13 and showing his first collection at the age of 15.

In 2003 Koma moved to London to take up a place at the Central Saint Martins College of Art and Design. After completing his BA in Fashion Design, Koma graduated with an MA Fashion in April 2009, winning a Harrods Design Award at the Graduate Fashion Week.

Career

Straight after graduation Koma launched his eponymous ready-to-wear brand and has been a participant of London Fashion Week ever since. Singer Beyoncé first wore a dress by Koma in 2009, for the MTV Europe Music Awards, which was pulled from his Central Saint Martins graduate collection.

From December 2013 until December 2017 Koma held the position of creative director at Mugler.

Recognition
Over the years, the David Koma brand has received numerous prizes including Vauxhall Fashion Scout in 2009, NEWGEN sponsorship in 2010 and Fashion Forward in 2013. In 2018 and 2019, David Koma was shortlisted for the British Fashion Council / Vogue Fashion Fund.

See also
Lako Bukia, Georgian fashion designer based in London
Tata Naka, Georgian dress label based in London
Demna Gvasalia, Georgian fashion designer, creative director of Balenciaga

References

British fashion designers
Artists from Tbilisi
Georgian emigrants to England
Fashion designers from Georgia (country)
Alumni of Central Saint Martins
Living people
Georgian emigrants to Russia
Businesspeople from London
Year of birth missing (living people)